"The Avenue" is a song by grime collective Roll Deep. The song samples from "Heartache Avenue", a 1983 song by The Maisonettes. The song is the group's first without Dizzee Rascal and it entered the UK Singles Chart at number eleven.

Track listing
Digital download
"The Avenue" (Radio Edit) – 2:32

CD Single
"The Avenue" (Radio Edit) – 2:32
"When I'm 'Ere" -

Chart performance

References

2005 songs
Relentless Records singles
2005 debut singles
Roll Deep songs